Lyndsey Marshal (born 16 June 1978) is an English actress best known for her performance in The Hours, and as the recurring character Cleopatra on HBO's Rome, and as Lady Sarah Hill in BBC period drama Garrow's Law.

Biography
Marshal was born in Manchester, England. She attended Old Trafford Junior School and Lostock High School. After studying the classics at college for a career in archaeology, she applied to the Royal Welsh College of Music and Drama.

Her first major part was in the play Fireface at the Royal Court Theatre, which she took just before graduation. In 2001 she won the Critics' Circle Theatre Award for Best Newcomer in 2001 for her performances in Redundant at the Royal Court Theatre and Boston Marriage at the Donmar Warehouse. In 2003, she won the TMA Theatre Award for Best Supporting Actress in A Midsummer Night's Dream. Since then she has performed leading roles in 14 theatre productions, most recently alongside James McAvoy in the 2009 West End production Three Days of Rain. In 2011 she appeared in Greenland at the National Theatre.

Marshal has appeared in the films The Hours alongside Nicole Kidman, and Hereafter, directed by Clint Eastwood.

Marshal starred as Cleopatra in HBO's Rome. Since 2009 she has played Lady Sarah Hill in the three series of the BBC One drama Garrow's Law and, with Julie Walters, in the BBC TV film A Short Stay in Switzerland. She starred also in ITV's new series of Agatha Christie's Marple.

In January 2013 Marshal played Eileen Blair, wife of Eric Blair, in the BBC Radio 4 drama The Real George Orwell – Homage to Catalonia. She also played Queen Gertrude in the radio drama series “Elsinore”.

Filmography

Theatre

Awards
2001 Critics' Circle Theatre Award Best Newcomer (Redundant / The Boston Marriage)
nomination 2002 Evening Standard Award Best Newcomer (Redundant / The Boston Marriage)
nomination 2002 Olivier Award Best Supporting Actress (The Boston Marriage)
2003 TMA Theatre Award Best Supporting Actress (A Midsummer Night's Dream)
nomination 2006 Ian Charleson Award (The Hypochondriac)
2016 1st International Film Festival & Awards – Macao Best Actress (Trespass Against Us)

References

External links

Lyndsey Marshal's National Theatre member profile
Lyndsey Marshal's Troika Talent profile

1978 births
Actresses from Manchester
English film actresses
English television actresses
English stage actresses
English radio actresses
English voice actresses
English Shakespearean actresses
Living people
Alumni of the Royal Welsh College of Music & Drama
21st-century English actresses
People educated at Lostock High School